Quick on the Draw was an American game show that aired on the now-defunct DuMont Television Network.

Broadcast history
Quick on the Draw featured cartoonist Bob Dunn, was first hosted by Eloise McElhone (1921-1974) and then by Robin Chandler, and aired from January 18, 1952, to December 9, 1952. Dunn would draw sketches that celebrity panelists would try to identify.

The show started as a local (non-network) show May 27, 1950, and while on the DuMont network, aired Tuesdays at 9:30 pm EST.

McElhone also a panelist on the ABC game show Think Fast and on the NBC/ABC show Leave It to the Girls, and hosted the DuMont-WABD series Eloise Salutes the Stars.

Episode status
As with most DuMont series, no episodes are known to exist.

See also
List of programs broadcast by the DuMont Television Network
List of surviving DuMont Television Network broadcasts
1952-53 United States network television schedule
Face to Face (NBC, 1946–47, also featuring Bob Dunn)

References

Bibliography
David Weinstein, The Forgotten Network: DuMont and the Birth of American Television (Philadelphia: Temple University Press, 2004) 
Alex McNeil, Total Television, Fourth edition (New York: Penguin Books, 1980) 
Tim Brooks and Earle Marsh, The Complete Directory to Prime Time Network TV Shows, Third edition (New York: Ballantine Books, 1964)

External links
 
 DuMont historical website

1952 American television series debuts
1952 American television series endings
1950s American game shows
Black-and-white American television shows
DuMont Television Network original programming
English-language television shows
Lost television shows